Isaac Alvarez (26 July 1930 – 3 November 2020) was a French actor, mime, and choreographer. He founded the École du théâtre du mouvement in Paris in 1956 alongside Jacques Lecoq. In 1981, he founded the Théâtre du Moulinage in Lussas.

Biography
During World War II, Alvarez was subjected to Nazi Germany's concentration camps. Upon his release, he would enter the world of theatre, following after Charles Dullin. He met Jacques Lecoq in the 1950s, and they founded the École du théâtre du mouvement in 1956, which would become the École internationale de théâtre Jacques Lecoq.

Alvarez acted in theatrical productions, films, and television series. He collaborated with Jean-Luis Barrault for The Siege of Numantia, which was performed in 1965 at the Chorégies d'Orange.

Alvarez traveled across France to teach with the Comédiens-mimes de Paris. He would teach a young Philippe Decouflé in his acting workshops. In 1981, he founded the Théâtre du Moulinage, which doubled as a theatre and an acting school. After the theatre closed its doors in 2008, Alvarez worked with the Teatro Instabile in Aosta, Italy.

Isaac Alvarez died in Aubenas on 3 November 2020 at the age of 90.

Creations
Vie à Pablo Neruda (1978)
Mémoire en blanc
Le Rire et l'Oubli
Sacerdoce pour un caoutchouc
Les Chevaliers du naufrage
Au candélabre des pas perdus
Passeport pour l'éphémère (1989)
À bâtons rompus (1990)

Theatre
Le Gisant (1958)
Compagnie Jacques Lecoq (1959)
Les Bâtisseurs d'empire (1959)
Hamlet (1960)
Le Monstre Turquin (1964)
Les Bâtisseurs d'empire (1966)

Directed Plays
The Siege of Numantia (1965)
Protée (1969)

Filmography
La Belle Équipe (1958)
Julie la Rousse (1959)
Du rififi chez les femmes (1959)
Cyrano de Bergerac (1960)
Etudes aux Allures et Les Trois Soldats (1961)
Le Perroquet du fils Hoquet (1963)
Belphegor, or Phantom of the Louvre (1965)
Les Compagnons de Baal (1968)

References

1930 births
2020 deaths
20th-century French actors
21st-century French actors
French mimes
French male film actors
People from Alexandria